Monteros is a town in Tucumán Province, Argentina, located  south-west of the provincial capital San Miguel de Tucumán, and which lies at an altitude of .

History

It was founded on August 28, 1754, when the military governor Don Felipe Antonio de Alurralde took possession of the local lands over an existing village on the site. Though Monteros had been known as a little village years before. Monteros eventually acquired the rank of municipality on December 12, 1867, with its first mayor Don Domingo Segundo Aráoz. It has been one of the most renowned and prosperous towns from southern Tucumán due to its cultural, educative and commercial life.

Toponymy
There have been several versions about the origin of the town's name. One version suggests that some inhabitants of the old San Miguel de Tucumán, which used to be on a place currently known as Ibatín, refused to move to the new location and declared in rebellion, taking refuge in the nearby hills. The name may have derived from "people of the hill" (Monte in Spanish). Another version says that the remaining inhabitants of the old San Miguel de Tucumán founded Monteros on October 4, 1865, naming it the Town of the Holy Rosary of Monteros. There were three attempts to rename the town. In 1828 and 1832 Villa Belgrano was the name proposed, in honor of Manuel Belgrano but it did not succeed. The strangest case was in 1932 when the then provincial governor, Alejandro Heredia, attempted to rename it to Alexandria, in his own honor.

Economy
The main use of agriculture in the local economy is the sugar industry. The Ñuñorco plant (founded in 1926) is the main industrial plant in the town. The rural areas nearby the town are suited to growing sugar cane, lemons, blueberries and strawberries.

Sports
The main sports club is Club Atlético Ñuñorco football club, which plays in Zone B of the regional Liga Tucumana de Fútbol of Argentina. The Club Social Monteros have been an Argentine Volleyball League's champion.

References

 
 Information based on "Breve Historia de Monteros" (short history of Monteros) from local historian Tulio Ottonello.

External links
 Monteros Government official website
 Federal website
 Geo coords 
 Main Monteros city site
 Monteros city site
 3D Church of Monteros - Nuestra Señora del Rosario
 Google Maps

Populated places in Tucumán Province
Cities in Argentina
Argentina
Tucumán Province